The following is a list of notable events and releases of the year 1904 in Norwegian music.

Events

 December
 Adolf Østbye, revue artist, made the first gramophone record in Norway.

Deaths

 September
 31 – Sigurd Lie, violinist, composer, and orchestra conductor (born 1871).

Births

 September
 7 – Ernst Glaser, violinist, orchestra conductor, and music teacher (died 1979).

 September
 7 – Ragnar Steen, guitarist (died 1958).

 October
 26 – Torbjørn Knutsen, composer and violinist (died 1987).

See also
 1904 in Norway
 Music of Norway

References

 
Norwegian music
Norwegian
Music
1900s in Norwegian music